Lee Vines (April 11, 1919 – July 9, 2011) was a Canadian-born American radio and television announcer and actor. He was best known to television audiences in the 1950s as the announcer on the What's My Line? game show.

Television announcer
He also was the announcer for other television shows including The Big Surprise, Celebrity Talent Scouts, Down You Go, Fractured Phrases, The Funny Side, Make the Connection, Medic, Picture This Robert Q's Matinee, The Name's the Same, Password and Hallmark Hall of Fame. His acting and voice-over roles included Hong Kong Phooey and The Mary Tyler Moore Show (as WJM announcer Lee).

Radio Announcer
Radio programs for which Vines was the announcer included Bouquet for You, County Fair, Dr. Standish, Medical Examiner, The Janette Davis Show, Kings Row and Time for Love.

Personal life
Vines was born on April 11, 1919, in Brantford, Ontario, Canada, but immigrated to the United States. In 1943, he enlisted in the United States Army during World War II and served in the European Theater.

Vines died from complications of pneumonia and a fall at a convalescent facility in North Hollywood, Los Angeles, on July 9, 2011, at the age of 92.

References

External links

1919 births
2011 deaths
Deaths from pneumonia in California
Game show announcers
Radio and television announcers
American male television actors
United States Army personnel of World War II
Canadian emigrants to the United States